Production art may refer to:

 a form of art, also called productivist art developed principally in Russia, applying art to factory production
 the work carried out by a Production artist